Belgian French is the variety of French spoken mainly among the French Community of Belgium, alongside related Oïl languages of the region such as Walloon, Picard, Champenois, and Lorrain (Gaumais). The French language spoken in Belgium differs very little from that of France or Switzerland. It is characterized by the use of some terms that are considered archaic in France, as well as loanwords from languages such as Walloon, Picard, and Dutch.

French is one of the three official languages of Belgium alongside Dutch and German. It is spoken natively by around 45% of the population, primarily in the southern region of Wallonia and the Brussels-Capital Region.

Influences
While a number of oïl languages have traditionally been spoken in different areas of Wallonia, French emerged as the regional language of literature in the 13th century. This was a result of heavy French cultural influence on the region over the past few centuries. The diversity of local languages influenced French in Wallonia, with words from Walloon, Picard, Champenois and Lorrain making their way into the local variant. Until the 20th century, Walloon was the majority language of Wallonia, and most speakers were bilingual in French and Walloon.

While the French spoken in Wallonia was influenced by local languages, the variant spoken in Brussels was influenced by Dutch, specifically the local Brabantian dialect. The city, geographically in the Flanders region, originally spoke only Dutch. However, a gradual Francisation began in the 19th century and intensified towards the end of the century and continued throughout the 20th century. Today, many Dutch expressions have been translated into French and are used in the language in the Brussels area.

Phonology

There are a few consistent phonological differences between the French in France and Belgium but usually no more than the differences between regional dialects within France (or the ones that exist between the English of Toronto and Vancouver (Canada) for instance), which might even be nonexistent. Regional accents however, can vary from city to city (the Liège accent being an example). However, on the whole, accents may vary more according to one's social class and education.

While stronger accents have been more typical of the working class, they have become much less pronounced since World War I and the widespread use of television, which has helped to standardise accents and the types of words used by speakers. Belgian speakers are taught the pronunciation of standard Belgian French in schools. The following differences vary by speaker, according to level of education, age and native region:
Thus, enfuir (to run away) and enfouir (to bury) are pronounced the same, unlike in France and Quebec.
The nasal vowels are pronounced like in France:  → ,  → ,  → , but the distinction between the nasal vowels  and  has been retained in Belgium, but in many regions of France such as Paris, the two have merged. For example, in Belgium, brin (stalk) and brun (brown) are still pronounced differently, like in Quebec but unlike in Paris.
The distinction between the vowels  and  has been maintained in final open syllables. For example, peau (skin) and pot (jar) are still pronounced differently, unlike in France and Quebec.
There are more distinctions between long and short vowels than Quebec French; all the circumflexes are pronounced:
Otherwise, many words are pronounced with a long  even if there is no circumflex: peine  and reine , etc.
As a result, almost all feminine adjectives are still phonetically distinct from their masculine counterparts in Belgium, unlike in France and Quebec.
In France and Quebec, some words are pronounced , as in German. For example, the word wagon (train car) is pronounced  in France and Quebec, but  in Belgium.
Some speakers devoice final stops; then, d is pronounced like t, b is pronounced like p and g is pronounced like k.
To some speakers, short vowels  are pronounced more open in closed syllables: .

Certain accents, such as in certain cities (notably Brussels and Liège) and those of speakers who are older and particularly less educated, are farther from the pronunciation of France. For example, in the dialect in and around Liège, particularly for older speakers, the letter "h" is pronounced in certain positions. It is always silent, however, in Standard French. That dialect is known also for its slow, slightly singing intonation, a trait that is even stronger toward the east, in the Verviers area.

Vocabulary
Words unique to Belgian French are called "Belgicisms". (This term is also used to refer to Dutch words used in Belgium but not in the Netherlands.) In general, the Francophone and educated speakers understand the meaning and use of words in Standard French, and they may also use Standard French if they speak with non-Belgians who speak in Standard French, as their accent hints. Overall, the lexical differences between Standard French and Belgian French are minor. They could be compared to the differences that might exist between two speakers of American English living in different parts of the United States or those between a Canadian English speaker and a British English speaker.

Furthermore, the same speakers would often be well aware of the differences and might even be able to "standardise" their language or use each other's words to avoid confusion. Even so, there are too many forms to try to form any complete list in this article. However, some of the better-known usages include the following:
Those former words occur also in Swiss French.
The words for meals vary, as described in the table below. The usage in Belgian, Swiss and Canadian French accords with the etymology: déjeuner comes from a verb meaning "to break the fast". In France, however, breakfast is rendered by petit déjeuner. Souper is used in France to refer instead to a meal taken around midnight. 
{| border="2" cellpadding="4" cellspacing="0" style="margin: 1em 1em 1em 0; background: #f9f9f9; border: 1px #aaa solid; border-collapse: collapse;"
!English
!Belgian, Swiss, and Canadian French
!Standard French
|-
||breakfast||déjeuner/petit déjeuner||petit déjeuner
|-
||lunch/dinner||dîner||déjeuner
|-
||dinner/supper||souper||dîner
|-
||late-evening meal/supper||N/A||souper
|-
|}
Many Walloon words and expressions have crept into Belgian French, especially in the eastern regions of Wallonia:
Qu'à torate (similar to à bientôt, "see you soon")
pèkèt ("jenever")
barakî (similar to the word chav in British English).
Qué novel ? (similar to quoi de neuf ?, "what's up ?")
Germanic influences are also visible:
Crolle ("curl") reflects the Brabantic pronunciation of the Dutch word krul.
S'il vous plaît is used to mean "here" (when someone is handed something) as well as "please", but in France, the meaning is limited to "please", "voilà" is used for "here". That is comparable to the use of alstublieft in Dutch.
Sur (from Dutch zuur) means "sour", but in France, the word acide is used.
Dringuelle (Standard French "pourboire"), "tip", from the Dutch word drinkgeld, but it is less commonly used in Brussels.
Kot (student room in a dormitory) from Belgian Dutch "kot".
Ring (ring road) from Dutch "ring". In Standard French, the term is "ceinture périphérique" or "périph'".
Savoir (to know) is often used in the place of pouvoir (to be able [to]). It was quite common, however, in older forms of French.
Blinquer (to shine), instead of briller, has a Germanic origin and passed through Walloon.
Bourgmestre (mayor), instead of maire.

Grammar
The grammar of Belgian French is usually the same as that of France, but Germanic influences can be seen in the following differences:
Ça me goûte, Standard French "ça me plaît", "I like it" (only for food), is a calque of Dutch Dat smaakt: Spanish 'me gusta'.
Tu viens avec ?, Standard French "Tu m'accompagnes?", literally "Are you coming with?" (meaning "Are you coming with me?"), is a calque of Dutch Kom je mee?.
Ça tire ici (used mostly in Brussels), for Standard French "Il y a un courant d'air") "There is a draught" is a calque of the Belgian Dutch Het trekt hier (Netherlands Dutch Het tocht hier).
Phrases like pour + V : "Passe-moi un bic pour écrire" (Standard French "Donne-moi un stylo afin que je puisse écrire") "Give me a pen, so that I can write / for me to write" is a grammatical structure found in Dutch ("om te +V").
"Qu'est-ce que c'est que ça pour un animal ?" Standard French "Qu'est-ce que c'est comme animal ?" / "Quelle sorte d'animal c'est ?", "What kind of animal is this?" (literally, "What is that for an animal?"), Dutch "Wat is dat voor (een) dier?" or "Wat voor dier is dat?"
The use of une fois ("once") in mid-sentence, especially in Brussels, is a direct translation of Dutch "eens". French people who want to imitate the Belgian accent often use a lot of "une fois" at the end of the sentences, often wrongly: "Viens une fois ici, literally from the Dutch "Kom eens hier" ("Come once here"). The English equivalent would be "Could you come here?" or "Why don't you come here?"
Jouer poker ("Standard French "Jouer au poker") "Play n poker" is influenced by the Dutch Poker spelen.

See also
Bruxelles
Joseph-Désiré Mobutu
International Association for the Exploration and Civilization of Central Africa
Belgian Congo
Wallonia-Brussels Federation
Léopold Louis Philippe Marie Victor
Walloon, a Romance language related to French, spoken in Belgium

References

External links

 Dictionnaire des belgicismes: a dictionary of Belgicisms.

French language
Languages of Belgium
French dialects